The 2012 Prairie View A&M Panthers football team represented Prairie View A&M University in the 2012 NCAA Division I FCS football season. The Panthers were led by second year head coach Heishma Northern and played their home games at Edward L. Blackshear Field. They were a member of the West Division of the Southwestern Athletic Conference (SWAC) and finished the season with an overall record of three wins and eight losses (3–8, 3–6 SWAC).

Media
All Prairie View A&M games were carried live on KPVU 91.3 FM.

Before the season

2012 recruits
12 players signed up to join the 2012 Prairie View A&M team.

Schedule

Game summaries

Texas Southern

Sources:

Lamar

Sources:

Alabama A&M

Sources:

North Dakota State

Sources:

Jackson State

Sources:

Grambling State

Sources:

Alcorn State

Sources:

Southern

Sources:

Alabama State

Sources:

Mississippi Valley State

Sources:

Arkansas–Pine Bluff

Sources:

Roster

References

Prairie View AandM
Prairie View A&M Panthers football seasons
Prairie View AandM Panthers football